Dimitar Todorov Dimov (25 June 1909 – 1 April 1966) was a Bulgarian dramatist, novelist and veterinary surgeon.

Biography 
Born in Lovech, Dimov is best known for his best-selling novel Tobacco (translit. Tyutyun, 1951) which was made into the 1962 film Tobacco directed by Nikola Korabov. The plot of Dimov's Tobacco deals with the fates of a number of characters connected to a major tobacco factory. The central thread of the plot is the story of Boris, an ambitious youth of poor origins who renounces his first love Irina to marry Maria, the heiress of the tobacco business. He proceeds to steer the business with great greed and ruthlessness. His wife's descent into insanity and death in the loveless marriage subsequently allows him to marry Irina, who has studied to become a doctor, but is seduced by the promise of the luxurious life as a mistress and eventually spouse of an affluent factory owner. However, their common life is poisoned by the preceding events and by their own selfishness and moral decay. Other characters, including a brother of Boris and a friend of Irina who works at the factory, are devoted to the Communist movement and its struggle; these and various other plot threads make the book into a broader picture of capitalist Bulgaria in the years leading up to the Communist seizure of power. The novel criticises the egoism, careerism, greed and exploitation characteristic of the class society that it depicts from a socialist perspective.

Other novels authored by Dimov are Lieutenant Benz (1938), a story of fatal love between flawed characters during World War I; and Doomed Souls (1945), a tragic tale of a dissolute young Englishwoman's passionate obsession with a fanatical and reactionary Jesuit set in Spain during the civil war. His plays included Holiday in Arko Iris and Women with a Past.

Dimov died in Bucharest, Romania. There is a bust of Dimov in the Borisova gradina park behind the Vasil Levski National Stadium in Sofia. His daughter Theodora Dimova is also a writer. In addition, a number of elementary schools across Bulgaria are named in his honor (particularly in his hometown of Lovech and in Plovdiv).

References

Bibliography 
 Димитър Веселинов. Френската лексика в романа "Тютюн" [The French words in the novel Tobacco], София, Сиела, 2009, 304 с.

External links 
 

Bulgarian writers
1909 births
1966 deaths
Bulgarian novelists
Male novelists
Bulgarian male writers
Male veterinarians
People from Lovech
Burials at Central Sofia Cemetery
20th-century Bulgarian novelists
Bulgarian veterinarians
20th-century male writers